New Albany and Salem Railroad Station may refer to:

New Albany and Salem Railroad Station (Gosport, Indiana), listed on the National Register of Historic Places in Owen County, Indiana
New Albany and Salem Railroad Station (New Albany, Indiana), listed on the National Register of Historic Places in Floyd County, Indiana